Invol2ver is a mix album by Welsh DJ Sasha, released on 8 September 2008 through British record label Global Underground. It was released as a sequel to his 2004 mix album, Involver. Like its predecessor, tracks from other artists have each been remixed to give Sasha's own interpretation of them. A follow-up was released in 2013, titled Involv3r.

Track listing

Charts

References

External links

Review of Invol2ver, inthemix

Sasha (DJ) albums
2008 compilation albums